The Starlight Bowl is an amphitheatre located in Burbank, California.  Originally built in 1950, today it seats 3,000 in chairback seating and 2,000 more on the lawn for a total capacity of 5,000.

See also
 List of contemporary amphitheatres

External links
 
 Design firm proposes fixes to aging Starlight Bowl

Amphitheaters in California
Buildings and structures in Burbank, California
Tourist attractions in Los Angeles County, California
1950 establishments in California